Nanjingese may refer to:

 The people or culture of Nanjing, China
 The dialects spoken in Nanjing
 Nanjing dialect
 Nanjingese Wu dialects